Carlo Graaff (22 July 1914 – 8 December 1975) was a German politician of the Free Democratic Party (FDP) and former member of the German Bundestag.

Life 
Graaff was a member of the German Bundestag from 4 July 1955, when he succeeded Robert Dannemann, until 8 May 1959 and from 1965 until his death in 1975. From 15 June 1972 until the end of the legislative period, he was Chairman of the Bundestag's Economics Committee. From the 1963 state elections until his resignation on 26 June 1963, he was a member of parliament in Lower Saxony (fifth term).

Literature

References

1914 births
1975 deaths
Ministers of the Lower Saxony State Government
Members of the Bundestag for Lower Saxony
Members of the Bundestag 1972–1976
Members of the Bundestag 1969–1972
Members of the Bundestag 1965–1969
Members of the Bundestag 1961–1965
Members of the Bundestag 1957–1961
Members of the Bundestag 1953–1957
Members of the Bundestag for the Free Democratic Party (Germany)
Members of the Landtag of Lower Saxony